Firmo is a town and comune in the province of Cosenza in the Calabria region of southern Italy, housing a large community of ethnic Albanians.

Notable people
 Salvatore Frega -  Italian composer of contemporary cultured music and experimental music

References

Arbëresh settlements
Cities and towns in Calabria